= Karachi Cattle Market =

Karachi Cattle Market کراچی مویشی منڈی
- Cattle market
- Country: Pakistan
- City: Karachi

Karachi Cattle Market (also known as Cow Mandi or Maweshi Mandi) (Urdu: کراچی مویشی منڈی) is a cattle market set up each year at, Karachi, Pakistan. The market is often regarded as Asia's largest cattle market, and thousands of animals are sold by small, independent traders. The purchasers buy the animals to sacrifice them on account of Eid al-Adha, an annual festival celebrated among the Muslims.

== Location and size ==
Karachi Cattle Market is located at a distance of 13 kilometers from Sohrab Goth Interchange. The size of the market is over 364 hectares, where more than 700,000 livestock, including cows, goats and lambs are displayed for sale. The sellers mainly arrive from rural regions of Sindh and Punjab, where livestock farming is a common profession.

The market plays a fundamental role in catering the large demand of the citizens of Karachi. With an annual estimated trade of 150 billion Pakistani Rupees, the market plays an essential role in the economy of the country.

== Traffic disruptions ==
While the market offers an opportunity for the city-wide buyers to purchase livestock, it leads to widespread traffic jams in the surrounding areas. The residents of Super Highway, including Gulzar e Hijri, have frequently protested against the traffic congestions and blockage of roads.
